Hoekaspis is an extinct genus of trilobites from the family Asaphidae.  It lived during the early part of the Arenig stage of the Ordovician, a faunal stage which lasted from approximately 466 to 461 million years ago.

Distribution 
Fossils of Hoekaspis have been found in France, Morocco, Bolivia and Argentina.

References 

Asaphidae
Ordovician trilobites
Ordovician trilobites of Africa
Ordovician trilobites of Europe
Ordovician France
Fossils of France
Ordovician trilobites of South America
Ordovician Argentina
Fossils of Argentina
Ordovician Bolivia
Fossils of Bolivia
Fossil taxa described in 1937